The Palace of Eternal Spring (pinyin changchungong) is one of the Six Western Palaces of the Forbidden City in Beijing, which used to be residences of imperial concubines. The palace is north of the Hall of the Supreme Principle, west of the Palace of Earthly Honour and north-west of the Palace of Eternal Longevity.

History 
The palace was built during the Yongle era in 1420, like most of the palaces in the Forbidden City, as the Palace of Eternal Spring (corresponding with eternal youth symbolized by spring). In 1535, the name of the palace was changed to "Palace of Eternal Tranquility" (永宁宫). The palace regained its current name after the ascension of the Qing dynasty and was renovated in 1689. In 1859, the inner gate of the palace was dismantled so as to connect with the neighbouring Hall of the Supreme Principle.

The most remarkable detail of the palace is a corridor painted with 18 Suzhou-style frescos depicting scenes from the "Dream of the Red Chamber" by Cao Xueqin. The palace also has a veranda near Tiyuan hall converted into an opera stage, where Peking opera performances were performed for Empress Dowager Cixi.

Residents

Ming Dynasty

Qing Dynasty

References 

Architecture in China
Forbidden City